Michael Jason Isbell (born February 1, 1979) is an American singer-songwriter and guitarist. He is known for his solo career, his work with the band The 400 Unit, and as a member of Drive-By Truckers for six years, from 2001 to 2007. Isbell has won four Grammy Awards.

Early life 
Isbell was born in Green Hill, Alabama, two miles from the Alabama/Tennessee state line, the son of interior designer mother Angela Hill Barnett and house painter father Mike Isbell. Isbell's mother was only 17 years old (and his father 19 years old) when he was born and is the subject of a song, "Children of Children". Isbell's parents divorced, and he has two much younger half-siblings.

Isbell grew up in North Alabama. His grandparents lived on a farm down the road next to the school that Isbell attended; they looked after him while his parents were at work. His grandfather and uncle taught him to play various musical instruments, including the mandolin when he was six years old, as it was easier for him to grip as a small child. They enjoyed gospel music, bluegrass music, and the Grand Ole Opry. In high school, he played trumpet and French horn. Isbell's family would get together and play music every week, sometimes twice a week. Isbell's paternal grandfather, who came from a musical family, was a Pentecostal preacher and played guitar in church. Isbell spent his childhood attending both the Pentecostal church and the stricter Church of Christ, which permitted only singing without musical instruments.

Isbell started playing in a garage band and a country cover band when he was 14 or 15 years old with his friend, songwriter Chris Tompkins. They played at the Grand Ole Opry when Isbell was 16.

Isbell attended the University of Memphis, studying English and creative writing. He did not graduate, still requiring one physical education credit.

Career 
When Isbell was a teenager, many musicians took him under their wing. He got to know session bassist David Hood, father of Drive-By Truckers co-founder Patterson Hood, because David Hood was in the Florence, Alabama area and played around town on Friday and Saturday nights in local restaurants and bars. By this time, Patterson Hood and his future Drive-By Truckers co-founder, Mike Cooley,  were older and had moved out of town. Isbell would go watch David Hood and others perform. It took a while, but once he finally got up the nerve to tell them he played, they would have him sit in with them, which resulted in friendship and mentorship.

Isbell submitted demos and eventually got a publishing deal with FAME Studios of Muscle Shoals, Alabama, when he was 21. He worked with FAME for 15 years, through his solo album Southeastern. Isbell also recorded pieces of his solo albums at FAME Studios, as well as the Drive-By Truckers' The Dirty South.

Drive-By Truckers 

In 2001, at age 22, Isbell joined the Drive-By Truckers while they toured in support of their album Southern Rock Opera. The band operates out of Athens, Georgia, where Isbell lived while with the band. Co-founder Patterson Hood recalls that he met Isbell through Dick Cooper, a mutual friend from Muscle Shoals. Hood invited Isbell to join the Drive-By Truckers after he sat in with the group at an acoustic house party when guitarist Rob Malone did not show up.

Isbell recorded and contributed many songs to the Drive-By Truckers for their next three albums, 2003's Decoration Day, 2004's The Dirty South, and 2006's A Blessing and a Curse. The title track of Decoration Day was revealed by Isbell in the 2014 Live from Lincoln Center concert to be a true story about his family members.

For most of his time as a band member, Isbell was married to Shonna Tucker, who joined the band after Isbell as bassist. The two were part of the band's documentary, The Secret to a Happy Ending. The two later divorced.

On April 5, 2007, Isbell announced that he was no longer a member of the Drive-By Truckers. The following day, Patterson Hood confirmed the break on the band's official site. In his letter to the fans, Hood described the parting of ways as "amicable" and expressed the hope that fans would continue to support the Drive-By Truckers as well as Isbell's solo efforts. Isbell had been with the Drive-By Truckers for six years.

On June 15, 2014, Isbell teamed with Hood and Mike Cooley for a benefit at the Shoals Theater in Florence, Alabama. The sold-out acoustic performance was the first time Isbell had performed with his former bandmates since they split in 2007. In August 2015, Hood joined Isbell onstage and played a couple of Drive-By Truckers songs together in Hood's new adopted hometown of Portland, Oregon.

Solo work 
Isbell released his first solo album, Sirens of the Ditch, on July 10, 2007. In 2012, Isbell supported singer-songwriter Ryan Adams on his tour. Both played solo acoustic sets.

On June 11, 2013, Isbell released his fourth solo album, Southeastern. Produced by Dave Cobb and featuring accompanying vocals by Kim Richey and Isbell's wife, Amanda Shires, Southeastern received overwhelmingly positive critical reviews, earning a score of 87 on Metacritic. Southeastern led to Isbell's clean sweep of the 2014 Americana Music Awards. Southeastern won Album of the Year, Isbell was named Artist of the Year, and the song "Cover Me Up" was named Song of the Year. It was later certified Gold by RIAA in 2022. NPR rock critic Ken Tucker listed Southeastern at No. 1 on his top ten albums of 2013. Isbell's record received praise by artists like Bruce Springsteen and John Prine. The music video for the song "Traveling Alone" features the Jackson House, a historic home in Moulton, Alabama.

Isbell's fifth solo record, Something More Than Free, was released on July 17, 2015, on Southeastern Records. Dave Cobb again produced the album, which was recorded at Nashville's Sound Emporium studio with a full band. During the summer of 2015, Isbell was on a North American tour to promote the album, with four consecutive sold-out nights at the Ryman Auditorium in Nashville at the end of October. In April 2016, Isbell appeared on the BBC live-music show Later With Jools Holland, singing "The Life You Chose", one of the tracks from Something More Than Free.

Isbell said that compared to Southeastern, Something More Than Free has a feeling of celebration, which reflects his upcoming fatherhood and a forward-facing momentum. One track on the record, "To a Band I Loved", is a love-letter to the band Centro-Matic, a now defunct band from Denton, Texas, Isbell played with back in his Drive-By Truckers days.

Something More Than Free debuted at number 1 on Billboard Magazine's rock, folk and country record charts. Although Isbell had had critical success in the Americana genre, this was the first time he received such high ranking across genres. The album was well received, winning two Grammy awards for Best Americana Album and Best American Roots Song ("24 Frames"). On May 11, 2016, Isbell, a four-time winner, was nominated for three more Americana Music Honors & Awards: Album of the Year (Something More Than Free), Song of the Year ("24 Frames"), and Artist of the Year. He won the first two, while Chris Stapleton won Artist of the Year.

Emergence of The 400 Unit 
Isbell's band, The 400 Unit, is primarily made up of musicians from the Muscle Shoals, Alabama, area. The lineup is:
 Sadler Vaden, guitar, backup vocals – also of Drivin' N Cryin'
 Jimbo Hart, bass, backup vocals
 Derry DeBorja, keyboard, accordion, backup vocals – formerly of Son Volt
 Chad Gamble, drums, backup vocals – brother of Al Gamble
 Amanda Shires, fiddle, backup vocals

The band's name comes from the 400 Unit, a colloquial name for the psychiatric ward of Eliza Coffee Memorial Hospital in Florence, Alabama. It was originally called the 400 Unit because it was in a separate building from the main three-story hospital. After renovation in the 1980s, the ward was renamed as the Behavioral Health Center, also known as 1st North, and is located on the hospital's first floor.

Jason Isbell and The 400 Unit's eponymous album was released on February 17, 2009, on Lightning Rod Records. Jason Isbell and The 400 Unit was Isbell's second solo release and his first release with The 400 Unit. Matt Pence of Centro-Matic co-produced and engineered the record, as well as playing drums on the record.

Isbell and the 400 Unit released their second album, Here We Rest, on April 12, 2011, on Lightning Rod Records. The album was produced and recorded by the band. The song "Alabama Pines" was named Song of the Year at the 2012 Americana Music Awards.

On March 13, 2017, Isbell announced a new album with the 400 Unit, The Nashville Sound. The album was released on June 16, 2017. Isbell and the band won the Grammy Award for Best Americana Album and Isbell won Grammy Award for Best American Roots Song at the 60th ceremony.

In October 2017, Isbell was announced to be the official artist-in-residence at the Country Music Hall of Fame and Museum. He made a guest appearance on John Prine's 2018 album The Tree of Forgiveness. Isbell contributed the ballad "Maybe It's Time" to the soundtrack of the 2018 film A Star Is Born, where it was performed by actor Bradley Cooper's character, Jackson Maine.

On February 11, 2020, Isbell announced a new album, Reunions. It was released on May 15, 2020. Reunions sees Isbell once again working with producer Dave Cobb and features guest vocals by Jay Buchanan of Rival Sons and David Crosby. The album announcement was made alongside the release of the first song of the album, "Be Afraid", which peaked at a career high number 5 on the Adult Alternative Songs chart. Also, second single, "Dreamsicle" peaked at number 20 on the same chart.

On November 5, 2020, Isbell announced on Twitter that if Joe Biden won the state of Georgia in the 2020 United States presidential election, he would record a charity album featuring covers of songs by Georgia artists, such as R.E.M. and Gladys Knight. After it was projected that Biden had won the state, he reaffirmed on Twitter that he was being serious and that he would begin work on the album shortly. The album, entitled Georgia Blue, was formally announced on September 14, 2021 with release dates of October 15 for the digital version and November 26 for CD and vinyl. Isbell and the 400 Unit contributed a cover of the Metallica song "Sad but True" to the charity tribute album The Metallica Blacklist, released in September 2021.

Acting 
Isbell's first acting role came in 2016 when he guest starred in the animated TV series Squidbillies, providing the voice of pastor Kyle Nubbins. The show has featured other Americana singers in cameo roles, including Elizabeth Cook, Todd Snider, and the Drive-By Truckers, among others. In 2019, Isbell had a cameo as a guitar-playing wedding guest in the HBO film Deadwood: The Movie. Billions, another TV series known for giving cameo roles to musicians, featured Isbell in a 2021 episode, with Isbell playing himself viewing an art exhibit.

In 2021, Isbell was cast in the upcoming Martin Scorsese film Killers of the Flower Moon as Bill Smith, a victim of the Osage Indian murders. Isbell's role in the film was announced on April 6, 2021, and will mark his major on-screen acting debut; fellow country singer Sturgill Simpson was also announced as being part of the cast.

Musical influences 
Isbell has spoken about the importance of his northern Alabama roots: "I definitely don't feel like I would be the musician that I am, or the type of songwriter, had I not come from that particular place," he says now. "The soul music that came out of there, and a lot of the soul-influenced rock and roll and country music that came out of the studios in north Alabama in the 1960s and 1970s had a big influence on me." Isbell said that working at FAME Studios was "everything" to him, that it was "a gateway towards the music that he wanted to play". In addition to citing Neil Young as a big influence, Isbell is a fan of singer-songwriter Ben Howard and guitarist Blake Mills.

Personal life 
Isbell was previously married to Shonna Tucker, a fellow musician from the Muscle Shoals, Alabama community and a former bass player for Drive-By Truckers. Isbell and Tucker were married in 2002.

Isbell was friends with Justin Townes Earle and played guitar on several of Earle's albums, including Harlem River Blues. Isbell and Shires both performed in a 2023 tribute concert to Earle after his death from a fentanyl overdose in 2020.

In February 2012, Shires, Isbell's manager Traci Thomas, and Ryan Adams initiated an intervention, leading to Isbell entering a rehabilitation treatment program at Cumberland Heights in Nashville. Isbell has discussed getting sober extensively, saying he drank Jack Daniel's and did cocaine during his time with Drive-By Truckers in his late 20s—a time he does not remember very clearly. Southeastern, Isbell's 2013 solo album, is reflective of his newfound sober lifestyle.

Isbell married singer-songwriter and violinist Amanda Shires, with whom he had worked on and off for a decade, in February 2013, two days after they finished Southeastern. Musician Todd Snider officiated their wedding. The couple have a daughter.

Isbell has a tattoo on the inside of his left arm with a quotation from the lyrics of the Bob Dylan song "Boots of Spanish Leather": “Just carry yourself back to me unspoiled, from across that lonesome ocean.” He said that the quote "reminds him about the idea of salvaging things", that for him it "evokes the idea of loss as well as learning and growing from the experience". During the 2015 Newport Folk Festival, Isbell cited Dylan as a huge influence on his writing.

Isbell has lived in Nashville, Tennessee, since 2011.

Discography

Studio albums

Live albums

Singles

Music videos

Producer credit

Filmography

Awards and nominations

Americana Music Honors & Awards 
The Americana Music Honors & Awards celebrate outstanding achievement in the genre of Americana. Isbell has won nine awards out of 19 nominations.

Country Music Association Awards 
The CMA Awards celebrate outstanding achievement in country music. Isbell has received one nomination.

Country Music Hall of Fame

Daytime Emmy Awards 
The Daytime Emmy Awards are American accolades bestowed by the New York–based National Academy of Television Arts and Sciences in recognition of excellence in American daytime television programming. Isbell has received one nomination.

Grammy Awards 
The Grammy Awards celebrate outstanding achievement in music. Isbell has won 4 awards out of 4 nominations.

UK Americana Awards 
The UK Americana Awards celebrate the best roots music released in the UK and internationally. Isbell has received two nominations.

Home media 
 Weissman, Barr, Patterson Hood, Mike Cooley, Shonna Tucker, Brad Morgan, John Neff, and Jason Isbell. The Secret to a Happy Ending: A Documentary About the Drive-By Truckers. New York: ATO Records, 2011. (DVD of 2009 documentary)

See also 
 Drive-By Truckers
 Muscle Shoals Sound Studio
 Muscle Shoals, Alabama
 Amanda Shires

References

External links 

 JasonIsbell.com (official site)
 
 

1979 births
Living people
People from Lauderdale County, Alabama
American male singer-songwriters
American country rock singers
American country singer-songwriters
American rock guitarists
American male guitarists
American rock singers
American rock songwriters
New West Records artists
Americana Music Honors & Awards winners
Grammy Award winners
Drive-By Truckers members
Guitarists from Alabama
21st-century American singers
Country musicians from Alabama
21st-century American guitarists
21st-century American male singers
Thirty Tigers artists
Singer-songwriters from Alabama